The 2013 NASCAR Camping World Truck Series was the nineteenth season of the Camping World Truck Series, the third highest stock car racing series sanctioned by NASCAR in North America. The season was contested over twenty-two races, beginning with the NextEra Energy Resources 250 at Daytona International Speedway and ending with the Ford EcoBoost 200 at Homestead-Miami Speedway. Matt Crafton of ThorSport Racing claimed his first championship with only one finish outside the top twenty and by completing every lap of the season. Toyota won the year's Manufacturers' Championship, while Kyle Busch Motorsports won the Owners' Championship, with its No. 51 entry.

Teams and drivers

Complete schedule

Limited schedule

Schedule
The final calendar was released on November 28, 2012, containing 22 races. Speed was re-launched in August as Fox Sports 1. The two iterations televised every race in the United States.

Season summary
Prior to the season, NASCAR lowered its age limit for participation in the Camping World Truck Series to age 16, with a stipulation that 16- and 17-year-old drivers could only participate at races held at ovals 1 mile and shorter, and at road course tracks.

The Camping World Truck Series started its 2013 season at Daytona International Speedway. Johnny Sauter would hold off Kyle Busch over the last few laps to avenge his loss in 2012 and take the victory. Following a month-long break, the Trucks returned to action at Martinsville Speedway. Rookie polesitter Jeb Burton would dominate most of the race. However, Daytona winner Sauter passed Burton with 17 to go, and pulled away from teammate Matt Crafton to win his second race in a row. The trucks traveled to Rockingham Speedway for the first stand-alone weekend of the season. Nationwide regular Kyle Larson dominated the race, leading 187 laps and cruising to his first career win. Ron Hornaday Jr. was penalized late in the race for intentionally sending Bubba Wallace into the fences, later fined $25,000 and was put on probation until June 12.

The Truck Series returned to action at the repaved Kansas Speedway. James Buescher, who dominated the intermediate tracks en route to the 2012 title, dominated the race, but was hampered by a slow four tire pit stop late in the race. Matt Crafton and Joey Coulter would inherit the top two positions, and the two would swap the lead for the final 30 laps until Crafton prevailed, taking his 3rd career Truck win since 2011. At Charlotte Motor Speedway, Kyle Busch would rally from a pre-race engine change and would drive past Miguel Paludo late in the race to claim his first Truck Series win since 2011.

With a week off, the Truck Series returned to action at Dover International Speedway. Polesitter Bubba Wallace would dominate the race. However, teammate and boss Kyle Busch took the lead from Wallace and Matt Crafton on lap 145 and never looked back, taking his second consecutive win of the season. At Texas, Ty Dillon would have the dominant truck, though four-time Texas winner Brendan Gaughan took the lead from Dillon during the middle portion of the race. However, a loose truck would take Gaughan out of contention. On the restart at lap 144, rookie Jeb Burton drove past Dillon and held him off for his first career win. At Kentucky Speedway, Wallace once again dominated the race, leading 54 laps, but was taken out in a mid race incident with polesitter Ryan Blaney. Ty Dillon would inherit the lead from Kyle Busch and easily held off Busch and Brad Keselowski for his first win of the season.

The Truck Series arrived at the Eldora Speedway for the inaugural Mudsummer Classic, the first race on dirt in any series since 1970. Ken Schrader started on pole, the oldest pole sitter in any NASCAR series at 58 years, but Austin Dillon and Kyle Larson battled for the lead throughout most of the race, with Dillon leading a race-high 63 laps. Dillon held off Larson and Ryan Newman on a green-white-checker finish to win his first start of the year. The Trucks would then trek to Pocono Raceway. After a brief rain delay before the race, Ryan Blaney pulled away from pole sitter Miguel Paludo on the second green white checkered attempt to take his first win of the season. After a week off, the series returned to action at Michigan International Speedway. Polesitter Jeb Burton would dominate most of the race, seeking his second win of the year. Defending champion James Buescher would take the lead late in the race from Kyle Busch and would go on to take his first win of the season. At Bristol Motor Speedway, defending winner Timothy Peters led most of the race. However, Kyle Busch would rally from a penalty to take the lead late from Peters and hold off his late pass attempt to take the win.

The Trucks made their inaugural trip to Canadian Tire Motorsport Park and the series' first road course since 2000 for the Chevrolet Silverado 250. Chase Elliott led most of the first half, and Ty Dillon would dominate most of the second half of the race. However, Dillon's strategy of pitting on lap 35 of 64 forced him to stretch his fuel. Elliott would chase down Dillon through the last 15 laps.

The Trucks then made their return to Iowa Speedway. Ross Chastain would dominate most of the race, leading 116 laps. Due to NASCAR allowing the teams only two sets of tires, James Buescher made the call to pit late to take a final set of sticker tires while others had used up their sets. This would prove to be the winning move as Buescher made his way past Chastain and held him off on two green white checkered attempts to take his second win of the season. At Chicago, Kyle Busch would dominate most of the race, but would have to fend off Brad Keselowski for his fourth Truck Series win. The Trucks then made their stop at the Las Vegas Motor Speedway. Late in the race, Ron Hornaday Jr. looked to snap his winless streak. However, Jennifer Jo Cobb slammed the wall, forcing a restart with 2 to go. Hornaday spun his tires, allowing Timothy Peters to get by and take his first win on an intermediate track.

With the season winding down, the Truck Series traveled south to Talladega Superspeedway. Most of the afternoon would be dominated by survival. On the final run to the finish, Daytona winner Johnny Sauter, with a push from teammate Matt Crafton, vaulted ahead of the field in the tri-oval and took his third win of the season as chaos erupted behind him. The Trucks then returned to Martinsville Speedway. There, outside polesitter Bubba Wallace would dominate the race, while Cup drivers Denny Hamlin and Kevin Harvick were taken out in separate incidents. Wallace would hold off Brendan Gaughan over the final 10 laps to take his first career win in the Truck Series, becoming only the second African American to win in NASCAR's top 3 series. Returning to Texas Motor Speedway, Ty Dillon would dominate the night, leading 130 of 147 laps en route to his third win of the season and the 100th win for the No. 3 in NASCAR's top series. Trekking out to the Phoenix International Raceway, it would be an all-night duel between young drivers Erik Jones and Ross Chastain. Points leader Matt Crafton continued his top-10 form, and only needed to start the final round at Homestead to win his maiden NASCAR championship.

At the season finale at Homestead-Miami Speedway, while Crafton wrapped up the championship by starting his engine, the Owners Championship and Rookie of the Year battles were still to be decided. The night would be dominated by polesitter Ryan Blaney and Kyle Busch, the latter trying to win the owners championship. It seemed as though Crafton's 88 team would wrap up both championships when he crashed on lap 136 with Joey Coulter and Brennan Newberry. Busch would hold off Blaney and Jeb Burton on three green-white-checkered finishes to take his sixth win of the season and claim the Owners Championship with Crafton finishing 21st. Blaney would claim Rookie of the Year honors over Burton and Bubba Wallace.

Results and standings

Races

Drivers' standings

(key) Bold - Pole position awarded by time. Italics - Pole position earned by final practice results or rainout. * – Most laps led.

Manufacturer

See also
2013 NASCAR Sprint Cup Series
2013 NASCAR Nationwide Series
2013 NASCAR K&N Pro Series East
2013 NASCAR K&N Pro Series West
2013 ARCA Racing Series
2013 NASCAR Canadian Tire Series
2013 NASCAR Toyota Series
2013 NASCAR Whelen Euro Series

References

 
NASCAR Truck Series seasons